Elvina Haydaryanovna Karimova (born 25 March 1994) is a Russian water polo player of Tatar descent.

She was part of the Russian team at the 2015 World Aquatics Championships, and 2016 Summer Olympics.

See also
 List of Olympic medalists in water polo (women)
 List of World Aquatics Championships medalists in water polo

References

External links
 
olympians.pointafter.com
sportresult.com

Zimbio
excludenudity=true&sort=mostpopular&mediatype=photography&phrase=elvina%20karimova&family=editorial Getty Images

Russian female water polo players
Living people
Place of birth missing (living people)
1994 births
Water polo players at the 2016 Summer Olympics
Olympic water polo players of Russia
Olympic bronze medalists for Russia
Olympic medalists in water polo
Medalists at the 2016 Summer Olympics
Universiade medalists in water polo
World Aquatics Championships medalists in water polo
Universiade gold medalists for Russia
Medalists at the 2013 Summer Universiade
Water polo players at the 2020 Summer Olympics
Volga Tatars
Tatar sportspeople
Tatar people of Russia
Sportspeople from Chelyabinsk Oblast
21st-century Russian women